John Kissel may refer to:

John Kissel (New York politician) (1864–1938), New York State Senate
John Kissel (Connecticut politician) (born 1959), Connecticut State Senate